Meadow Lakes may refer to:

Meadow Lakes, Alaska
Meadow Lakes, California

See also
 Meadow Lake (disambiguation)